Dying to Know: Ram Dass & Timothy Leary is a 2014 documentary film about Ram Dass and Timothy Leary.

References

External links
 
 

2014 films
2014 documentary films
American documentary films
Documentary films about psychology
Timothy Leary
Ram Dass
2010s English-language films
2010s American films
English-language documentary films